Krishna Gopal Shrestha  is a Nepali communist politician and former minister  of Nepal. He is a politician belonging to main opposition party of Nepal CPN(UML).

Political career
Shrestha joined politics in 1979 as a member of CPN ML, the predecessor of CPN UML. He was arrested and imprisoned multiple times during the fight against the partyless Panchayat system.  He became the party's Kathmandu district secretary in 1982.  He became Bhaktapur district secretary in 1986, and Lalitpur district secretary in 1990.  After the formation of CPN UML, he had remained the party's central committee member from 1998 to 2018, when the party was merged with CPN (Maoist Centre).

He was elected from Kathmandu-5 constituency in the by-election of 1992, after party secretary Madan Bhandari vacated the seat. He won the 1994 legislative election from Kathmandu-7 constituency. He was defeated in Kathmandu-9 in the 1999 election.

He was appointed the State Minister for Local Development in 2005.

In the 2008 constituent assembly election, he contested from Kathmandu-9 again, but was defeated. In the 2013 election for the second constituent assembly, he was the CPN UML candidate in Kathmandu-9 constituency but lost again to his longtime rival Dhyan Govinda Ranjit of Nepali Congress.

In the 2017 election, he was elected from Kathmandu-9 constituency representing CPN UML of the left alliance.

Following the merger of CPN UML with CPN (Maoist Centre), he was appointed the deputy chief of the treasury and financial management department of the new party.

Personal life
He was born on October 1, 1958, to Hari Lal and Hari Maya Shrestha in Kathmandu. He has said that he came from a humble background, and was admitted directly to the fifth grade, having been self-taught up to that point. He went on to achieve a Master's Degree in Economics. He has two daughters.

References

Living people
Communist Party of Nepal (Marxist–Leninist) politicians
Communist Party of Nepal (Unified Marxist–Leninist) politicians
Nepal Communist Party (NCP) politicians
Government ministers of Nepal
Newar
1958 births
Nepal MPs 2017–2022
Nepal MPs 1991–1994
Nepal MPs 1994–1999
Education ministers of Nepal
Nepal MPs 2022–present